Boris Čizmar (born 28 August 1984), is a Serbian futsal player who plays for FC Kemi in Finland and ex player of Serbia national futsal team.

References

External links
UEFA profile

1984 births
Living people
Serbian men's futsal players